Nácori Chico Municipality is a municipality in Sonora in north-western Mexico.

The municipal area is 2,748.67 km2 (1,061.27 mi2) with a population of 2,236 registered in 2000. 

The seat is Nácori Chico.

Neighboring municipalities
Neighboring municipalities are: Huachinera to the north, Sahuaripa to the south, Bacadéhuachi to the west, and the state of Chihuahua to the east.  Nácori Chico is connected by a dirt road to Bacadéhuachi

References

Municipalities of Sonora